The V-League 5th Season 1st Conference is a tournament of the Shakey's V-League. The tournament began on March 30, 2008 and ended on May 30, 2008 at The Arena in the city of San Juan.
Joining are NCR teams Ateneo de Manila University, Adamson University, College of Saint Benilde, Far Eastern University, Lyceum of the Philippines University, San Sebastian College - Recoletos, and Visayas teams University of Saint La Salle and University of San Jose - Recoletos

Adamson University finally broke its runner-up "curse" by winning over Ateneo de Manila University in two games to none in the finals series. This makes them the third champion team, alongside University of Santo Tomas and De La Salle University.

Tournament Format
Double Round Robin Preliminaries. If a team is seeded at 1 and 2, they will automatically have a slot in the Semifinals and will skip the Quarterfinals.
All remaining Manila and Visayas teams will merge in a Single Round Robin affair. 
Top two teams with the best record after the single-round robin quarterfinals will advance to the semifinals
However, If a team won 3 out of 5 games in the quarterfinals, they will have a chance for a playoff berth against the second seed team for the right to enter the semifinals
The automatic semifinalists and the quarterfinalist advancers will now move on to the Single Round Robin Semifinals. Whoever seeds 1 and 2, will make it to the best of three championship series.
There will be a playoff if seeds 2 and 3 will be tied once more.
Best of Three Championship series
If the battle for the gold ended in two games only, the battle for the bronze will be best of three also instead of one game.

Starting Line-ups

Eliminations Standing

Preliminaries

Legend: WD = Won by Default, LD = Lost by Default

Quarterfinals Standing

Quarterfinals

Semifinals Standing

Semifinals

Battle for First Standing

Battle for Third Standing

Finals

Conference Awardees

Best Scorer:  13 Beverly Boto - Lyceum of the Philippines University
Best Attacker:  7 Jaroensri Bualee (Guest Player) - San Sebastian College-Recolletos
Best Blocker:   8 Ma. Rosario Soriano - Ateneo de Manila University
Best Setter:   5 Janet Serafica - Adamson University
Best Digger:  6 Lizlee Ann Gata - Adamson University
Best Server:  8 Angela Benting - Adamson University
Best Receiver: 5 Mary Jane Pepito - San Sebastian College-Recolletos
Most Improved Player: 8 Ma. Rosario Soriano - Ateneo de Manila University
Finals MVP: 4 Rissa Jane Laguilles - Adamson University
Conference MVP: 11 Nerissa Bautista (Guest Player) - Adamson University

References

Shakey's V-League conferences
2008 in Philippine sport
2008 in volleyball